Marga may refer to:

People
Marga (Batak), a family name in Batak society
Marga Barbu (1929–2009), Romanian actress
Marga Boodts (1895–1976), woman claimed to be Grand Duchess Olga Nikolaevna of Russia
Marga Gomez (born 1960), Puerto Rican/Cuban-American comedian, playwright, and humorist
Marga Klompé (1912–1986), Dutch politician
Marga López (1924–2005), Argentine-Mexican actress
Marga Minco (born 1920), Dutch journalist and writer
Marga Ortigas, Manila-based correspondent for Al Jazeera English
Marga Petersen (1919–2002), German athlete who competed mainly in the sprints
Marga Richter (born 1926), American composer
Marga Scheide (born 1954), Dutch former model and a singer
Marga Schiml (born 1945), German opera singer
Marga T (born 1943), Indonesian writer
Marga van Praag (born 1946), Dutch journalist and television presenter

Places
Marga, Estonia, a village in Estonia
Marga (East Syrian diocese), a mediaeval diocese of the Church of the East
Marga, Caraș-Severin, a commune in Caraș-Severin County, southwestern Romania
Marga, Tabanan, a subdistrict (Kecamatan) of Tabanan Regency, Bali, Indonesia
Marga Marga Province, one of the eight provinces in the central Chilean region of Valparaíso
Marga (river), a tributary of the river Bistra in Caraș-Severin County, southwestern Romania
Marga, a village in Godeanu Commune, Mehedinți County, western Romania
Marga, now called Yemişli, Uludere in Turkey

Religion
Ananda Marga, socio-spiritual organization founded in Jamalpur, Bihar, India
Marga (Sanskrit mārga; Pali magga, "path") in Buddhism refers to the path to enlightenment
Marga in Hinduism refers to a way of accomplishing something such as yoga or sādhanā

See also 
 Margaretha

Feminine given names
Given names derived from gemstones